Michael Anthony Holston (born January 8, 1958 in Seat Pleasant, Maryland) is a former American football wide receiver in the National Football League. Holston was selected in the third round by the Houston Oilers out of Morgan State University in the 1981 NFL Draft.

External links
NFL.com player page
Stats

1958 births
Living people
People from Seat Pleasant, Maryland
American football wide receivers
Morgan State Bears football players
Houston Oilers players
Kansas City Chiefs players
Players of American football from Maryland